Circulus cinguliferus is a species of sea snail, a marine gastropod mollusk in the family Tornidae.

Description

Distribution
This marine species occurs in the Indian Ocean off Madagascar.

References

Tornidae
Gastropods described in 1850